The following is a list of Miss Chinese International pageant edition and information.

Host Country/Territory by Number

 No Pageant Held in 1990, 2011, 2020

References